Madonna and Child is a 1512-1517 oil on canvas painting by Cima da Conegliano, now in the Rijksmuseum in Amsterdam.

References

Amsterdam
1510s paintings
Paintings in the collection of the Rijksmuseum